Campionato Primavera 1, known also as Campionato Primavera 1 TIMvision – Trofeo Giacinto Facchetti due to sponsorship and posthumous honour, is an Italian football youth competition. It was created in 2017–18 season by splitting Campionato Nazionale Primavera into two leagues: Campionato Primavera 1 and Campionato Primavera 2, and organized by Lega Nazionale Professionisti Serie A and Lega Nazionale Professionisti B respectively.

In the first season (2017–18), all 16 teams of Campionato Primavera 1 were the under-19 youth teams of Serie A clubs; it was based on a ranking system that the top 16 youth teams of the clubs of 2017–18 Serie A, qualified to Campionato Primavera 1, and the rest qualified to Campionato Primavera 2. However, the regulation also allowed the champions and runner-up of Campionato Primavera 2 would promoted to the future edition of Campionato Primavera 1; Empoli and Entella, had their youth teams finished as the losing side of the first round of the playoffs of 2016–17 season, which consisted of 14 teams, but excluded from the first edition of Campionato Primavera 1 due to the regulation.

Past winners

Source: Lega Serie A

References

External links
  

Youth football competitions in Italy
Italy